Ocean Machine – Live at the Ancient Roman Theatre Plovdiv is the third live album from Devin Townsend Project. It was released on 6 July 2018. The album features a full live performance of Ocean Machine: Biomech, as of the 20th anniversary of the album as well as a set of fan-requested tracks with the Orchestra and Choir of Plovdiv State Opera. The concert was filmed at the Ancient Roman Theatre in Plovdiv, Bulgaria on 22 September 2017.

Background
Regarding the release of the album, band leader Devin Townsend commented:

Track listing

DVD

 Truth (from Infinity and Transcendence)
 Stormbending (from Transcendence)
 Om (from Christeen + 4 Demos and Infinity's original track list)
 Failure (from Transcendence)
 By Your Command (from Ziltoid the Omniscient)
 Gaia (from Synchestra)
 Deadhead (from Accelerated Evolution)
 Canada (from Terria)
 Bad Devil (from Infinity)
 Higher (from Transcendence)
 A Simple Lullaby (from Synchestra)
 Deep Peace (from Terria)
 Seventh Wave (from Ocean Machine)
 Life (from Ocean Machine)
 Night (from Ocean Machine)
 Hide Nowhere (from Ocean Machine)
 Sister (from Ocean Machine)
 3 A.M. (from Ocean Machine)
 Voices in the Fan (from Ocean Machine)
 Greetings (from Ocean Machine)
 Regulator (from Ocean Machine)
 Funeral (from Ocean Machine)
 Bastard (from Ocean Machine)
 The Death of Music (from Ocean Machine)
 Things Beyond Things (from Ocean Machine)

References

External links
 
 
 

2018 live albums
Progressive metal albums by Canadian artists
Live progressive rock albums
Devin Townsend albums